"Spare Me the Details" is a song by American punk rock band the Offspring. The song is featured as the tenth track from their seventh studio album, Splinter (2003), and was released as a single in 2004 in Australia and New Zealand only. 

The song saw heavy rotation on Australian rock radio station Triple M

Track listing

Greatest Hits
The song was included as the fifteenth track on the Australian version of the band's Greatest Hits (2005).

Charts

References

2004 singles
The Offspring songs
Songs written by Dexter Holland
Song recordings produced by Brendan O'Brien (record producer)
Ska punk songs
2003 songs
Columbia Records singles